Jetstrike is a horizontally scrolling shooter published in 1994. It was originally released for the Amiga, and also for the A1200 as an AGA version, then released again on the Amiga CD32.

Gameplay
Jetstrike is a side scrolling shooter, similar in feel to Defender (1981) and Wings of Fury (1987) with a wrap around screen and left-to-right-to-left turning across the landscape. Jetstrike includes 200 aircraft to choose from each with a slightly different feel and almost as many weapons with which to shoot down aircraft or blow up ground-based enemies.

Reception
The CD32 version was ranked the 28th best game of all time by Amiga Power in 1996.

References

External links
Jetstrike at the Amiga Hall of Light

1994 video games
Amiga games
Amiga CD32 games
DOS games
Horizontally scrolling shooters
Video games developed in the United Kingdom